The 1995 Maryland Terrapins football team represented the University of Maryland in the 1995 NCAA Division I-A football season. In their fourth season under head coach Mark Duffner, the Terrapins compiled a 6–5 record, finished in a tie for fifth place in the Atlantic Coast Conference, and were outscored by their opponents 251 to 210. The team's statistical leaders included Brian Cummings with 1,193 passing yards, Buddy Rodgers with 718 rushing yards, and Jermaine Lewis with 937 receiving yards.

Schedule

Roster

Game summaries

Tulane

North Carolina

West Virginia

Duke

Georgia Tech

Wake Forest

Clemson

Louisville

NC State

Virginia

Florida State

References

Maryland
Maryland Terrapins football seasons
Maryland Terrapins football